Oakworth Railway Station serves the village of Oakworth, near Keighley, and within the City of Bradford Metropolitan District, West Yorkshire, England.

History
The station was built by the Keighley and Worth Valley Railway (KWVR) and opened with the rest of the line for passengers on 15 April 1867 and for goods traffic on 1 July that year. The Midland Railway leased the line and absorbed the KWVR with effect from 1 July 1881. The London Midland and Scottish Railway absorbed the Midland Railway from January 1923 and took over operation of the line. British Railways took over the UK's railway system on 1 January 1948 and the line was closed to passengers on 1 January 1962 and to goods traffic on 18 June 1962.

Operations
Originally there was a signal box at the station which controlled a goods loop giving access to the goods yard and the level crossing.  This was removed in the 1950s and control of the level crossing passed to the station staff, although it is still noticeable that the level crossing is still double track width, even though there is only a single line through the crossing.

Preservation

The Keighley and Worth Valley Railway Preservation Society took over the line and re-opened the line and the station on 29 June 1968. Milk churns displayed on a hand cart and old railway posters bring back images of a former age. The platform fencing is used to display old enamel advertisement signs for period products such as Virol.

The station is famous for being the main location used in the film The Railway Children. The Station can still be seen much as was in the period 1905–1910. It is still lit by gas lights both inside the buildings and on the platform.

The station foreman on duty at Oakworth also has responsibility for the level crossing at the end of the platform, which is controlled by interlocked signals.

The station was also a location for filming part of the Joe Jackson video for the song "Breaking Us in Two" from the "Night and Day" album in 1982.

Some scenes for the first and second episodes of All Creatures Great and Small (2020 TV series) were filmed at the station.

See also
Listed buildings in Keighley

References

Notes

Bibliography

 
 

Heritage railway stations in Bradford
Former Midland Railway stations
Railway stations in Great Britain opened in 1867
Railway stations in Great Britain closed in 1962
Railway stations in Great Britain opened in 1968
Keighley and Worth Valley Railway